Duthieeae is a tribe of grasses, subfamily Pooideae, containing eight genera.

References

Pooideae
Poaceae tribes